David Gordon Hislop (1 June 1901 – 12 September 1985) was an Australian rules footballer who played with Richmond in the Victorian Football League (VFL).

Hislop died in Tasmania on 12 September 1985.

Notes

External links 

1901 births
1985 deaths
Australian rules footballers from New South Wales
Richmond Football Club players
Balmain Australian Football Club players